"Treat Them Like They Want to Be Treated" is a song by American hip hop artist Father MC, and features backing vocals by K-Ci and Jo-Jo, Devante Swing, and Mr. Dalvin, members of then-up-and-coming R&B group Jodeci. It was recorded for Father MC's debut album Father's Day, and released as its debut single in July, 1990.

Track listings
12", CD, Vinyl
"Treat Them Like They Want to Be Treated" (Regular Version) - 5:47
"Treat Them Like They Want to Be Treated" (Short Version) - 5:07
"Treat Them Like They Want to Be Treated" (Drum Drops) - 5:49
"Treat Them Like They Want to Be Treated" (Instrumental) - 5:08

33⅓ RPM, Promo
"Treat Them Like They Want to Be Treated" (Club Mix) - 5:17
"Treat Them Like They Want to Be Treated" (House Mix) - 4:00
"Treat Them Like They Want to Be Treated" (Club Instrumental) - 5:24
"Treat Them Like They Want to Be Treated" (R&B Remix) - 4:15
"Treat Them Like They Want to Be Treated" (Awesome Remix) - 5:19
"Treat Them Like They Want to Be Treated" (R&B Remix Instrumental) - 4:15
"Treat Them Like They Want to Be Treated" (Awesome Instrumental) - 5:19

Personnel
Information taken from Discogs.
executive production: Andre Harrell, Puff Daddy
production: Mark Morales, Mark Rooney
remixing: Mark Morales, Mark Rooney, Special K, Teddy Tedd
writing: Father MC, Mark Rooney

Chart performance

Notes

External links

1990 debut singles
1990 songs
Father MC songs
MCA Records singles
New jack swing songs
Uptown Records singles